Richard "Toby" Tobias Jr. (born June 16, 1966) is an American racing driver and chassis builder. He has competed in the United States Auto Club, NASCAR Busch Series and NASCAR Busch North Series. After racing, Tobias moved to Hershey, Pennsylvania and became a track owner. Tobias also started manufacturing Slingshot cars for use at local dirt tracks, and also maintained the family business, Tobias Speed Equipment Inc. In addition to racing NASCAR, Tobias also won a number of high-level dirt races in New York and Pennsylvania.

Motorsports career results

NASCAR
(key) (Bold – Pole position awarded by qualifying time. Italics – Pole position earned by points standings or practice time. * – Most laps led.)

Busch Series

Busch North Series

References

External links
 

Living people
1966 births
NASCAR drivers
Racing drivers from Pennsylvania
People from Lebanon, Pennsylvania
USAC Silver Crown Series drivers